Kenneth Hughes is an actor, dancer, director and writer working in film, TV and stage internationally.

He should not be confused with Ken Hughes (the now-deceased director of such movies as Chitty Chitty Bang Bang).

Performance and Biography 
Kenneth Hughes has worked with a wide range of recognized names such as Madonna, Meryl Streep, Michael Bay, Christopher Columbus, Tracey Ullman, Julie Taymor, Jim Carrey, the Bee Gees, Robert Zemeckis, Matthew Rolston, Coen Brothers, the ISO dance company, the Diavalo Dance Theater, the Rogue Go-Go Dance Company, Zubin Mehta, Mika Kaurismäki, Amy Brenneman, Val Kilmer, Eric Stoltz and others. He had films in Cannes, Sundance, and taught at CalArts. He has danced and acted in everything from A-list features to street theater and guerilla film groups. His directing and producing has spanned every form from feature films, commercials, music videos, to live events and stage. He recently started Unified Everything Project (501c3 Nonprofit) to bring the arts and sciences together for great spectacle and enriching of audience and creators alike. He is author of a kids book series: Wee Charles. Kenneth has even competed internationally stunt riding on horses (Vaulting), played professional dodgeball, and sung in the California Boys Choir conducted by Zubin Mehta with the L.A. Philharmonic. He has a pilot's license, Cinema degree, Equine Science degree and a law degree.

Directed and/or Produced 
Kenneth Hughes has a long history of producing/directing anti-studio feature films and many other projects live and media based. He started his career as a performing artist and has performed Internationally in Film, Radio, TV and Theater. His latest feature films won Best Feature at Comicon Einsteins God Model. His feature based on the novel by Tony DuShane and directed by Eric Stoltz (Confessions of a Teenage Jesus Jerk) was due out 2017. His debut award winning feature film: Bad Dog and Superhero, an underground musical released in 2012 starring Christian Hoff.  His genre bending vampire musical feature film Vampire Burt's Serenade, starring Kevin Richardson (musician) and Diva Zappa and Brian Gaskill was released 2020. He also produced Fell, Jumped or Pushed

He also directed the short film for internet viewing: The Tapster.  He directed The Donkey Punch Produced by: Anthony Russo Written by: John Hlavin and starring: Jay Karnes and Ann_Russo.  He also is completing two documentaries.

External links 
 Official website
 
 Vampire Burt's Serenade Official website
 Confessions of a Teenage Jesus Jerk Official website
 Bad Dog and Superhero Official website
 Fell, Jumped or Pushed Official website
 Wee Charles and the Strawberry Fairy King
 Wee Charles and the Flim Flam Spitty Witty
 Underground film journal review Bad Dog and Superhero
 Mlive interview with Kenneth Hughes
 Honeysuckle magazine interview with Kenneth Hughes
 Review Magazine interview with Kenneth Hughes
 Los Angeles Times article about The Bloody Indulgent
 Los Angeles Times review of Einstein's God Model

Year of birth missing (living people)
Living people
American male actors
American male dancers
American film directors